Charles Robert Knox (April 27, 1932 – May 12, 2018) was an American football coach at the high school, collegiate and professional levels. He served as head coach of three National Football League (NFL) teams, the Los Angeles Rams (1973–1977; 1992–1994), Buffalo Bills (1978–1982), and Seattle Seahawks (1983–1991). He was a three-time AP NFL Coach of the Year and is a member of the Seahawks Ring of Honor.

Early life
Knox was born in the Pittsburgh suburb of Sewickley, Pennsylvania. Whenever Knox felt something was common sense, he said it was "eighth-grade Sewickley."

The son of a steel worker who had emigrated from Ireland and a Scottish-born mother, Knox developed into a  tackle at Juniata College in Huntingdon, Pennsylvania, playing on both sides of the ball and serving as co-captain of the 1953 unit, the first undefeated team in school history. He also competed in track and graduated in 1954.

Early coaching career
Knox then served as an assistant at Juniata that fall.  The following year he became an assistant coach at Tyrone High School, then began the first of three years as head coach at Ellwood City High School in 1956.

Building on his success, Knox then moved back to the colleges, serving two seasons as an assistant under Paul Amen at Wake Forest University in 1959.  He then joined Blanton Collier's staff at the University of Kentucky in 1961, and stayed the following year under new mentor Charlie Bradshaw.  In both these places, Knox learned the concepts of organization, discipline and a focus on fundamentals.  While at Kentucky, Knox was on the staff of Bradshaw's infamous first team, which was known forever as the Thin Thirty.

On May 8, 1963, he was hired as offensive line coach of the American Football League's New York Jets by head coach Weeb Ewbank.  Over the next four years as the lead contact for recruiting quarterback Joe Namath, Knox helped build a line that protected Namath, eventually leading to a victory over the Baltimore Colts in Super Bowl III. However, by voluntarily leaving the Jets in 1967 he denied himself what would have been the only Super Bowl ring in his career as the Jets won the World Championship in 1968.

Knox then moved to the Detroit Lions on February 13, 1967, under new head coach Joe Schmidt, spending six seasons in the Motor City.  Despite some impressive stretches, the Lions reached the postseason only once during this period, losing a 5-0 road contest to the Dallas Cowboys in 1970. However, Knox developed effectively cohesive offensive lines and developed pass-blocking techniques that are now standard in blocking fundamentals. Additionally, he proved a progressive coach by playing Bill Cottrell, an African American, at center. "There was an unwritten rule back then", said Cottrell in Hard Knox: The Life of an NFL Coach. "No black quarterbacks, no black middle linebackers, no black centers." Because of Knox's liberal views and ability to relate to players on such a personal level, African American players nicknamed him, "Dolomite."

Head coaching career
When Tommy Prothro was dismissed on January 24, 1973, Knox was hired as head coach of the Rams.

Sometimes referred to as "Ground Chuck" for his team's emphasis on its rushing attack, Knox used a comeback year by veteran quarterback John Hadl to lead the Rams to a 12–2 record during his first season, winning the NFC West title.  Knox earned NFC Coach of the Year honors, but in the first round of the playoffs, the team lost to the Cowboys, beginning what would become a frustrating string of playoff defeats for Knox.

John Hadl became the 1973 NFC Most Valuable Player under Knox, proof that the passing dimension of his offense was as significant as the run game in his system. Six games into the 1974 season, Knox traded John Hadl, whose performance had diminished from his MVP '73 season, to the Green Bay Packers for an unprecedented two first round picks, two second round picks and a third round pick.  Knox started James Harris for the remainder of the 1974 season.  Harris became the NFL's first African American regular quarterback. Despite two and a half successful seasons, including a 12 and 2 record in 1975 with Harris under center, some Rams fans remained critical of Harris' play. Eventually, Knox, under pressure from owner Carroll Rosenbloom, was forced to bench Harris in favor of Pat Haden.

Under Knox the Rams won five straight NFC West championships. However each season they faltered in the playoffs.  They lost three consecutive NFC Championship games from 1974 to 1976, two of them to the Minnesota Vikings. In the team's rainy first round home playoff game against the Vikings on Monday December 26, 1977, quarterback Pat Haden was having problems handling the wet ball and the Rams lost in what was subsequently called the "Mud Bowl", 14–7.  Knox stepped down as Rams' head coach after the game.  In five seasons as the Rams head coach the team had won five straight NFC West titles with five different starting quarterbacks (John Hadl, Ron Jaworski, Pat Haden, James Harris, and Joe Namath) and had a regular season record of 54-15-1 but a play-off record of only 3–5.

On January 11, 1978, Knox left the Rams to sign a $1.2 million, six-year contract with the Bills.  The move was in response to the continuing conflict between Knox and team owner Carroll Rosenbloom, with Knox taking over a team that had won only 5 of 28 games during the previous two seasons and missed the playoffs three straight years, while Knox led the Rams to their first consecutive playoff appearances since the great 1949-1952 teams led by Bob Waterfield and Norm Van Brocklin.

In his first year (under the new 16-game schedule), Knox led the Bills to a 5–11 mark.  Just two years later, the Bills won the AFC East title with an 11–5 record, but dropped a close battle with the high-powered San Diego Chargers in the divisional playoffs.  The following year, his team defeated the Jets in a wild card clash, but then fell to the Cincinnati Bengals.  After a 4-5 strike-shortened season in 1982, Knox failed to come to terms on a new contract with team owner Ralph Wilson, and left to accept the head coaching position with the Seahawks on January 26, 1983.

During his first year in the Northwest, Knox led the team to its first playoff berth, beat the Denver Broncos 31–7 in the wildcard game and then upset the Miami Dolphins 27–20 in the Orange Bowl in the second round.  However, Seattle's playoff run ended in the AFC Championship game when the Seahawks fell to the Los Angeles Raiders 30–14.  Subsequent seasons saw the Seahawks remain competitive, but they did not reach a conference championship game again during his tenure, despite winning Seattle's first AFC West Division Title in 1988.

After nine years with Seattle, Knox left on December 27, 1991, having become the first NFL head coach to win division titles with three different teams.  Looking to recapture the magic of two decades earlier, Knox returned to the Rams as head coach in 1992.  While his tenure saw Jerome Bettis blossom into a star, his teams finished last in the NFC West in each of his three seasons.  He was fired on January 9, 1995.

Knox retired with a mark of 186 wins, 147 losses and 1 tie record, which at the time of his retirement was sixth all-time in wins.

In 2005, Knox donated $1 million to his alma mater, Juniata, to endow a chair in history, his major at the school.  The donation was the largest of many contributions by Knox, with the institution renaming the school's football stadium in his honor in 1998. Quaker Valley High School in Knox's hometown of Sewickley, Pennsylvania has also named its football stadium in his honor.

In reporting about Knox's $1 million donation, the Seattle Times noted that Knox has been extremely generous in donating substantial money to Juniata and his old high school.  The Times also noted that Knox left football before coaches were paid the large sum of salaries common today and reporters asked whether he was donating away a substantial amount of his retirement fund.  Knox answered the reporters this way: "sure it is (a lot of money).....that's what it was going to take to do it".

On September 25, 2005, at age 73, Knox was inducted into the Seattle Seahawks Ring of Honor at Qwest Field in Seattle and is regularly under consideration for nomination into the Pro Football Hall of Fame in Canton, Ohio.  In 2015, the Professional Football Researchers Association named Knox to the PFRA Hall of Very Good Class of 2015

Personal life and death
Knox's relationship with granddaughter Lee Ann was outlined in an article published by the Los Angeles Times in 2016 titled "Knox Has a Loving Advocate for His Legacy in Granddaughter Lee Ann Norman." The article reveals a different side of the tough Knox and focuses on his relationship with his oldest grandchild.

On May 12, 2018, Knox died after a long battle with Lewy Body Dementia at the age of 86. He was survived by his wife of 66 years, Shirley, four children and six grandchildren.

Head coaching record

See also
 List of National Football League head coaches with 50 wins

References

1932 births
2018 deaths
Buffalo Bills head coaches
Detroit Lions coaches
Juniata Eagles football players
Kentucky Wildcats football coaches
Los Angeles Rams head coaches
New York Jets coaches
Seattle Seahawks head coaches
Wake Forest Demon Deacons football coaches
High school football coaches in Pennsylvania
People from Sewickley, Pennsylvania
Players of American football from Pennsylvania